Neelkanth Tiwari was one of the most prolific lyricists and poets of his times. He spent his earlier years in Madhya Pradesh and later settled down in Mumbai. He died in February 1976 but left behind a collection of poems and songs that are still popular across India. A Hindi songwriter and poet known for his impeccable command over the language. He was closely associated with people such as Kishore Kumar and Dilip Kumar in the early years of the Indian film industry. He wrote Kishore Kumar's first yodeling hit song, "Tikram Baazi" and also the first film song legendary singer Mukesh chand Mathur sang "Dil Hi Bujha Hua Ho To" for the movie Nirdosh (1941). He also acted as a supporting actor in a movie with Dev Anand.

Neelkanth Tiwari also composed jingles and was a known critic in the Indian film industry.

He was survived by his wife Ramadevi Tiwari, two daughters and a son.

Famous songs

Movie Name: Nirdosh

Starring: Nalini Jaywant and Mukesh
Song: Dil Hi Ho Bujha Hua To
Music: Ashok Ghosh
Singer: Mukesh (1st Song of his career in the Film Industry)
Lyrics: Neelkanth Tiwari

Movie Name : Ram Baan
Starring Shobna Samarth & Prem Adib.
Song : Rom Rom Ramka karta pukaar
Sung by : Manna Dey
Lyrics: Neelkanth Tiwari

Movie Name : Adhikaar
Song : Tikdam Baazi Miya Raazi
Sung By : Kishore Kumar
Lyrics: Neelkanth Tiwari

Poets from Madhya Pradesh
Indian lyricists